Parrotville was a theatrical cartoon series that was featured in the Rainbow Parade series. The series debuted on September 14, 1934 and made its last episode on June 28, 1935. All of the three episodes in the series were featured in the 200 Classic Cartoons Collector's Edition DVD released by Mill Creek Entertainment on October 14, 2008. The series was also featured in the Giant 600 Cartoon Collection DVD pack released by the same company on July 22, 2008.

All three cartoons were directed by Burt Gillett.

Characters
 Mrs. Perkins - the main character of the series who appeared in every episode. She appears to be an energetic elderly parrot who is friendly to everyone but often gets into bad situations.
 The Captain - The Captain is a friend of Mrs. Perkins who appears in all three episodes. In Parrotvile Fire Department, he appears as a fire chief, without his sailor hat, but his design and voice are the same.
 The Old Folks - The Old Folks are a group of elderly parrots. They appeared in only one cartoon, Parrotville Old Folks, where they were invited to a party at their own "Old Folks Home."
 Black Parrot - The black parrot is a burglar who appeared in Parrotville Post Office. He tries to steal Mrs. Perkins' mail bag. Mrs. Perkins' children were inside the back causing the parrot to almost kidnap him. Matron catches him and traps him in the mail bag, he then sends him on the mail train.
 Mrs. Perkins' Children - Mrs. Perkins' children are two children parrots, a boy and a girl, are being baby-sat by the Captain in Parrotville Post Office. They hid inside the mail bag when the Black Parrot was robbing the post office and were almost kidnapped.

Filmography

1934 
 The Parrotville Fire Department

1935 
 Parrotville Old Folks
 Parrotville Post Office

References

External links
Parrotville at The Big Cartoon DataBase.
Parrotville at Don Markstein's Toonopedia. Archived at Don Markstein's Toonopedia. Archived from the original on April 14, 2015.
 
 
 

Van Beuren Studios